G. Davis Greene Jr. (March 22, 1931 – September 2, 2012) was an American politician and member of the Democratic Party. 

Greene was appointed to the office of Treasurer of Pennsylvania by Pennsylvania Governor Bob Casey on January 23, 1987, the day after the suicide of his predecessor, R. Budd Dwyer. He was sworn into office on February 11, 1987 after a unanimous vote by the Pennsylvania Senate, making him the 31st Treasurer of Pennsylvania.

Biography
Greene served in the United States Navy. He graduated from University of Pennsylvania and was a financial adviser.

Greene's appointment and confirmation to treasurer was done on the understanding that he would not seek a full four-year term in 1988. As agreed upon, he stepped down after the completion of Dwyer's term, and was succeeded by Catherine Baker Knoll.

References

University of Pennsylvania alumni
Military personnel from Philadelphia
Politicians from Philadelphia
Pennsylvania Democrats
State treasurers of Pennsylvania
1931 births
2012 deaths